1974 Emmy Awards may refer to:

 26th Primetime Emmy Awards, the 1974 Emmy Awards ceremony honoring primetime programming
 1st Daytime Emmy Awards, the 1974 Emmy Awards ceremony honoring daytime programming
 2nd International Emmy Awards, the 1974 Emmy Awards ceremony honoring international programming

 
Emmy Award ceremonies by year